This is a summary of the electoral history of Arnold Nordmeyer, Leader of the Labour Party (1963–65) and Member of Parliament for Oamaru (1935–49), Brooklyn (1951–54) & Island Bay (1954–69).

Parliamentary elections

1935 election

1938 election

1943 election

1946 election

1949 election

1951 by-election

1951 election

1954 election

1957 election

1960 election

1963 election

1966 election

Local elections

1971 civic election

Leadership elections

1954 Leadership election

1963 Leadership election

1965 Leadership election

Party elections

1940 Party Conference

1948 Party Conference

1949 Party Conference

1950 Party Conference

Notes

References

Nordmeyer, Arnold